Phuentsholing United FC was a football club from Phuntsholing, Bhutan. The club was founded in 2018. In 2019, they competed in the Bhutan Premier League, the top level of football in Bhutan.

References

External links
 Phuentsholing United FC at Soccerway
 Phuentsholing United FC at Global Sports Archive

Football clubs in Bhutan
Association football clubs established in 2018
2018 establishments in Bhutan
Association football clubs disestablished in 2019